Belizean Creole (Belizean Creole: Belize Kriol, Kriol) is an English-based creole language spoken by the Belizean Creole people. It is closely related to Miskito Coastal Creole, San Andrés-Providencia Creole, and Jamaican Patois (Limonese and Bocas del Toro dialects).

Belizean Creole is a contact language that developed and grew between 1650 and 1930, as a result of the slave trade. Belizean Creole, like many Creole languages, first started as a pidgin. It was a way for people of other backgrounds and languages, in this case slaves and English colonisers within the logging industry, to communicate with each other. Over generations the language developed into a creole, being a language used as some people’s mother tongue language.

Belizean Creoles are people of Afro-European origin. While it is difficult to estimate the exact number of Belizean Creole speakers, it is estimated that there are more than 70,000 in Belize who speak the language. The 2010 Belize Census recorded that 25.9% of the people within Belize claimed Creole ethnicity and 44.6% claimed to speak Belizean Creole and put the number of speakers at over 130,000. It is estimated that there are as many as 85,000 Creoles that have migrated to the United States and may or may not still speak the language.

Belizean Creole is the lingua franca of Belize and is the first language of some Garifunas, Mestizos, Maya, and other ethnic groups. It is a second language for most others in the country. When the National Kriol Council began standardizing the orthography of the language, it decided to promote the spelling Kriol, though they continue to use the spelling Creole to refer to the people themselves.

History

Origins 
Belizean Creole was developed as a lingua franca for those who were forced to work within the logging industry, and the language itself is linked to many West African substrate languages. This is due to the fact that these slaves, more specifically identified as Belizean "Creoles", were taken from Africa and Jamaica and brought to what was then known as British Honduras, which was the name of Belize when it was a British crown colony, before gaining independence in September 1981. 

The European Baymen first began to settle in the area of Belize City in the 1650s. Ken Decker proposed that the creole spoken in Belize previous to 1786 was probably more like Jamaican than the Belize Kriol of today. By the Convention of London of 1786, the British were supposed to cease all logging operations along the Caribbean coast of Central America, except in the Belize settlement. Many of the settlers from the Miskito Coast moved to Belize, bringing their Miskito Coast Creole with them. The immigrants outnumbered the Baymen five to one. The local Kriol speech shifted to become something more like the Miskito Coast Creole.

Linguistic influences and development 

Belize Kriol is derived mainly from English but is influenced by other languages brought into the country due to the slave trade. Its substrate languages are the Native American language Miskito, Spanish, and the various West African and Bantu languages that were brought into the country by slaves, which include Akan, Efik, Ewe, Fula, Ga, Hausa, Igbo, Kikongo, and Wolof.

There are numerous theories as to how creole languages form. The most common and linguistically supported hypothesis indicates that creoles start out as a pidgin languages when there exists a need for some type of verbal communication between members of communities who do not share the same language. In the case of Belize Kriol, the pidgin would have developed as a result of West Africans being captured and taken to the Americas as slaves to work in the logging industries, where they would be forced to communicate with slave owners of European descent. For the first generation of people speaking the pidgin language, the pidgin is not fully developed and the grammar of the language is not as systematic as fully fledged languages. When the people speaking the pidgin language begin having children who grow up having no entirely developed language, they will take the partial grammar of the pidgin language their parents speak and use it as a sort of blueprint with which they are able to assign a systematic grammatical structure to the language. It is at this point that the language becomes a fully fledged language, as it becomes a mother tongue for generations of speakers, and the result is a creole language. Belize Kriol specifically developed as a result of many West African slaves being subjected to English-speaking owners; and as a result, these people were forced to create a pidgin language using English as a substrate language which was then formed into a creole by their children.

Contemporary usage 
English is still considered the main official language of Belize, as it carries much prestige, due to the fact it is a majority language. Road signs, official documents, and such are all written in English and the people of Belize are taught in English throughout their educational careers. Despite this, bilingualism and multilingualism is common within Belize; and many people of all ethnic backgrounds in Belize have adopted the minority language Kriol as their native language. Kriol is the lingua franca of Belize and is the first language of some Garifunas, Mestizos, Maya, and other ethnic groups. It is a second language for most others in the country.

Today, Belize Kriol is the first or second language of the majority of the country's inhabitants. Many of them speak standard English as well, and a rapid process of decreolization is taking place. As a result, a creole continuum exists and speakers are able to code-switch among various mesolect registers, between the most basilect to the acrolect (Mid-Atlantic) varieties. The acrolect, much like the basilect, is rarely heard.

A 1987 travel guide in the Chicago Tribune newspaper reported that Belize Kriol is "a language that teases but just escapes the comprehension of a native speaker of English."

There are multiple regional vernacular varieties of Belizean Kriol; so, depending on where one is, the vernacular may be slightly different. A locale in the south of Belize, such as Punta Gorda, may have a slightly different Kriol vernacular than that one of the more northern areas, such as Belize City, which shows a vernacular closer to traditional Kriol, because of this, has gained more prestige than other vernaculars that stray farther away from the traditional vernacular.

Education and literature 
English taught in the schools of Belize is based on British English, but it is often influenced by the teachers' Kriol speech. The 1999 Ministry of Education: School Effectiveness Report (p. 84) notes that "Creole is spoken as the first language in most homes." Belizean people speak English, Kriol, and often Spanish, while learning the English system of writing and reading in schools. It is a slightly different system of communication from the standard forms. In recent years there has been a movement to have Kriol used more within the Belizean education system and in government documentation. The Belize Kriol Project and the National Kriol Council of Belize are at the forefront of this movement, striving to bring more prestige and recognition to the language.

Current literary works using Kriol include an English and Kriol dictionary, and a translation of the Bible's New Testament. The dictionary brought attention to grammar, as well as the definition of common Kriol words, and the dictionary influenced the creation of a few other books that were solely based on Kriol grammar. There has also been a rise in poetry, fiction, and newspapers written in Kriol.

Phonology 
Kriol shares phonological similarities with many Caribbean English Creoles as well as with English, its superstrate language. Pidgin languages have a general tendency to simplify the phonology of a language in order to ensure successful communication. Many creoles keep this tendency after creolization. Kriol is no exception to this.

Kriol uses a high number of nasalized vowels, palatalizes non-labial stops, and prenasalizes voiced stops. Consonant clusters are reduced at the end of words and many syllables are reduced to only a consonant and vowel.

 Like most creole languages, Kriol has a tendency to have an open syllabic structure, meaning there are many words ending in vowels. This feature is strengthened by its tendency to delete consonants at the end of words, especially when the preceding vowel is unstressed.
 Nasalization is phonemic in Kriol, caused by the deletion of final nasal consonants. The nasal feature is kept, even if the consonant has been dropped.
 Many Kriol speakers tend to palatalize the velar consonants  and  preceding .
 Like all other creole languages, Kriol has a tendency to reduce consonant clusters no matter where they occur. Final consonant clusters are almost always reduced by dropping the second consonant. Initial and medial occurrences are reduced much less consistently.
 When  occurs finally, it is always deleted. When it occurs in the middle of a word, it is often deleted leaving a residual vowel length.
 Although its superstrate language, English, makes extensive use of dental fricatives, Belizean Kriol does not use them. However, due to the ongoing process of decreolization, some speakers include such dental fricatives in their speech.
 Unstressed initial vowels are often deleted in Kriol. Sometimes this can lead to a glottal stop instead.
 Stress is evenly distributed across syllables, meaning that the prosody of Kriol is different than its lexifier. It is reserved mainly for content words and appears to only have High and Low tones.

Vowel chart

Consonant chart 

Some of these sounds only appear as allophones of phonemes.

Consonants and vowels 
Kriol uses three voiced plosives and three voiceless plosives. The voiceless stops can also be aspirated. However, aspiration is not a constant feature; therefore, the aspirated and non-aspirated forms are allophonic. The language employs three nasal consonants,. It makes extensive use of fricatives, both unvoiced and voiced (. The tongue is more lax here than in American English; its position is more similar to that of British English. Glottal stops occur rarely and inconsistently. Kriol makes use of eleven vowels: nine monophthongs, three diphthongs, and schwa . The most frequently occurring diphthong, is used in all regional varieties. Both  and  can occur, but they are new additions and are viewed as a sign of decreolization. The same is perceived of four of the less productive monophthongs.

Orthography 
Unlike most creoles, Kriol has a standardized orthography.

Consonants: b, ch, d, f, g, h, j, k, l, m, n, p, r, s, sh, t, v, w, y, z, zh

The symbol choices for lengthened vowels come from ways those vowels are spelled in English, not the International Phonetic Alphabet.
There is a dictionary for Kriol with over 5000 entries, including sample sentences for each word.

Morphology

Tense 
The present tense verb is not marked overtly in Kriol. It also does not indicate number or person. As an unmarked verb, it can refer both to present and to perfective. The English past tense marker || at the end of the verbs indicates acrolectal speech. However, there is the possibility to mark the past by putting the tense marker || before the verb. Overt marking is rare, however, if the sentence includes a semantic temporal marker, such as "yestudeh" (yesterday) or "laas season" (last season).

Unlike the marking of past tense, this marking is not optional.

Aspect

The progressive aspect 
The preverbal marker  expresses the progressive aspect in both past and present tense. However, if the past is not marked overtly (lexically or by using ), an unambiguous understanding is only possible in context.  is always mandatory. In the past progressive, it is possible to achieve an unambiguous meaning by combining  +  + verb.

The correct combination here would be  +  + verb.

The habitual aspect 
Kriol does not have a habitual aspect in its own right. Other creoles have a general tendency to merge the habitual with the completive, the habitual with the progressive, or the habitual with the future. Kriol however, does not clearly merge it with anything. Thus, we can only assume that the habitual is expressed by context and not by morphological marking.

The completive aspect 

Mood and voice

Conditional 
The short version, is employed only in the present tense; the past tense requires the longer forms.

Passive voice 
There is no overt lexical marking of active and passive in Kriol. It is only the emphasis of a sentence that can clarify the meaning, together with context. Emphasis can be strengthened by adding emphatic markers, or through repetition and redundancy.

Verb usage

Special verbs 
The equative form  is used as a copula (when the complement of the verb is either a noun or a noun phrase).  is the locative form that is used when the verb's complement is a prepositional phrase. No overt marking is used when the complement is an adjective. , finally, is used in the progressive aspect.

The verb "to go" is irregular in Kriol, especially when set in the future progressive. The past tense is expressed similarly: instead of employing , the lexical item  is used.

It can be used as a modal in casual requests, in threats and intentional statements, and, of course, like the standard verb "to make".

Noun usage

Plural formation 
Plurals are usually formed in Kriol by inserting the obligatory postnomial marker . As decreolization progresses, the standard English plural ending  occurs far more frequently.

The absence of an appropriate plural marker occurs rarely.

Loan words 
Many Spanish, Maya, and Garifuna words refer to popular produce and food items:

 panades
 garnaches
 salbutes
 tamales
 hudut
 wangla
 goma
 reyeno
 bundiga
 comadre
 compadre

Syntax

Syntactic ordering 
The construction of sentences in Kriol is very similar to that in English. It uses a Subject-Verb-Object order (SVO). All declarative and most interrogative sentences follow this pattern, the interrogatives with a changed emphasis. The construction of the phrases follows Standard English in many ways.

Locatives 
Locatives are more frequently used in Kriol and much more productive than in Standard English. The general locative is expressed by the morpheme  ("at" or "to"). This is an indication of either emphasis or decreolization. It is used in contexts where  is not strong enough.

Together with the verb "look", however,  is not used and considered as incorrect. To express "to look at", it is wrong to say "luk da". The correct version would be "luk pan".

Noun plus pronoun 
In a noun phrase, Kriol can employ a structure of both noun and pronoun to create emphasis. The ordering then is noun + pronoun + verb (for instance, "mista filip hi noa di ansa" – Mr. Philip knows the answer).

Adjectives 
Adjectives are employed predicatively and attributively. They can be intensified either by the postposed adverb modifier , by iteration, or by the use of the adverb modifier . Iteration is here the usual way. Comparatives and superlatives are constructed according to morphosyntactic rules. A comparative is made by adding  to the stem ("taal" – "taala" – tall). The morpheme  is employed to form comparative statements: for instance, "hî tɑlɑ dan shee" – He is taller than she. Superlatives are created by adding  to the stem. In all cases, the use of the definite article  is obligatory. The copula is present if the superlative is used predicatively. An example could be: "She dah di taales" – She is the tallest.

Adverbs 
Adverbs are used much as they are in Standard English. In almost all cases, they differ from adjectives not in form but in function. There are, however, a few exceptions, such as "properli" (properly), "errli" (early) or "po:li" (poorly). Adverbs can be intensified by reduplication.

Conjunctions 
Most Kriol conjunctions are very similar to English and are employed in the same way. The main difference is that Kriol allows double negation, so that some conjunctions are used differently. Some examples of conjunctions in Kriol are: "an" (and), "but" (but), "if" (if), "o:" (or) etc.

Questions usually take the same form in Kriol as they do in Standard English: question word + subject + verb. The "do-support" does not occur here either. The rising intonation at the end of the sentence may increase even more if no question word is used. Thus, most declarative sentences can become interrogative with the right intonation. "Which" has various translations in Kriol. If the speaker means "which", he uses , but he can also use  for "which one".

Grammar 
The tense/aspect system of Kriol is fundamentally unlike that of English. There are no morphologically marked past tense forms corresponding to English -ed -t. There are three preverbal particles: "mi" and "did" for the past, "di" as an "aspect marker", and a host of articles to indicate the future ("(w)a(n)", "gwein", "gouɲ"). These are not verbs, they are simply invariant particles that cannot stand alone, unlike the English "to be". Their function differs somewhat from English.

The present habitual aspect is unmarked but can be indicated by "always", "usually", etc. (i.e. is absent as a grammatical category).

 "mi" is a "tense indicator"
 "di" is an "aspect marker"
 "(w)a(n)", "gwein", "gouɲ") are used to indicate the future
 
 I run (habitually); I ran
 
 I am running
 
 I was running
   or 
 I have run; I had run
 ,  or 
 I am going to run; I will run

Like many other Caribbean Creoles,  and  have a number of functions, including:
 Directional, dative, or benefactive preposition
  ("They are fighting for us")
 Genitive preposition (that is, marker of possession)
  or /Dat da mi buk/ ("That's my book")
 Modal auxiliary expressing obligation or futurity
  ("He should be coming here")
 Pre-infinitive complementizer
  ("You (plural) have to contribute something to the Garifuna People for playing their music")

The pronominal system 
The pronominal system of Standard English can distinguish person, number, gender and case. Some varieties of Kriol do not have a gender or case distinction, though most do; but Kriol does distinguish between the second person singular and plural (you).

 I =  (occasionally mii in negations)
 me =  (exception is Ai, as in, "Mek ai tel yu")
 my, my, mine (possessive) = 
 you, you = 
 your, yours = 
 he, him =  (pronounced  in the basilect varieties)
 she, her =  (pronounced ; no gender distinction in basilect varieties)
 him, her =  (no gender distinction in basilect varieties)
 him = 
 her = 
 we, us = 
 us (3 or more)= 
 our, ours = 
 you (plural) = 
 they, them = 
 those =

Interrogatives 
The question words found in Kriol are:

 What? = 
 Why? = 
 Where? =  (What part?)
 Who? = 
 Whose? =  (For whom?)
 The supporting That =

Copula 
 the Kriol equative verb is also "da"
 e.g.  ("I am the teacher")
 Kriol has a separate locative verb "deh"
 with true adjectives in Kriol, no copula is needed

Contrasting copula forms

Copula = helping-verb forms of “be”

Kriol: Ai da di teecha

English: I am the teacher.

Kriol: Yu da di teecha.

English: You are the teacher

Kriol: Ih da di teecha.

English: He/She is the teacher.

Kriol: Ah da-mi di teecha

English: I was the teacher

Kriol: Yu da-mi di teecha

English: You were the teacher.

Kriol: She/Ih da-mi di teecha.

English: She/He was the teacher.

Kriol: Da huu dat?

English: who is that?

Negation 
  is used as a present tense negator:
  ("If the cow didn't know that he could swallow grass, he wouldn't have tried it")
  is used in the same way as English 'can't'
  ("He is a sickly thing that can't even mash an ant")
  is a negative past participle.
  ("John did not steal the money")

See also 
 English-based creole languages
 Miskito Coastal Creole
 Jamaican Patois
 San Andrés-Providencia Creole
 Bocas del Toro Creole
 Colón Creole
 Rio Abajo Creole
 Limón Coastal Creole
 Languages of Belize

References

Sources

External links 

 National Kriol Council of Belize  The Official National Kriol Council of Belize
 Wiwords.com A cross-referencing West Indian dictionary with substantial Belizean content
 The Bible in Belize Kriol
 Kriol-Inglish DIKSHINERI / English-Kriol Dictionary by Y. Herrera, M. Manzanares, S. Woods, C. Crosbie, K. Decker, and P. Crosbie; hosted online by SIL International
 Wiki in Belizean Creole

Belizean Creole people
English-based pidgins and creoles
Languages of Belize
English language in North America
Creoles of the Americas
Belizean culture
Languages of the African diaspora